is a Japanese footballer who currently plays for Tiamo Hirakata.

Career statistics

Club

Notes

References

1997 births
Living people
Association football people from Osaka Prefecture
Chukyo University alumni
Japanese footballers
Japanese expatriate footballers
Association football defenders
Singapore Premier League players
Japan Football League players
Albirex Niigata Singapore FC players
FC Tiamo Hirakata players
Japanese expatriate sportspeople in Singapore
Expatriate footballers in Singapore